James Moffat Forgie (31 October 1889 – 3 May 1969) was a Liberal party member of the House of Commons of Canada.

Forgie was born in Pembroke, Ontario and became a barrister and lawyer. He attended schools at St. Andrews College then Queen's University where he received his Bachelor of Arts in 1911, then attended Osgoode Hall Law School. He also served in World War I as a captain with the 48th Highlanders, then in World War II as a major with the Canadian Armoured Corps.

He made an unsuccessful attempt to win a seat in the Ontario Legislature in 1948. In the 1953 federal election, Forgie won at the Renfrew North riding and was re-elected there in 1957, 1958, 1962 and 1963. After completing his term in the 26th Canadian Parliament, Forgie left Parliament and did not seek a further term in the 1965 federal election.

References

External links
 

1889 births
1969 deaths
Members of the House of Commons of Canada from Ontario
Liberal Party of Canada MPs
Lawyers in Ontario
People from Pembroke, Ontario
Canadian Expeditionary Force officers
Canadian military personnel of World War II